Glenea sangirica is a species of beetle in the family Cerambycidae. It was described by Per Olof Christopher Aurivillius in 1903 and is known from Sulawesi.

References

sangirica
Beetles described in 1903